Peter Bennett is a British television producer, although he has predominantly worked as a first assistant director.

Bennett's credits as a first AD began with Emily (1976) and has continued with many other feature films, including The Mummy, The Mummy Returns, Alexander and Syriana, as well as the television series Minder, Agatha Christie's Poirot, Sea of Souls, the revived Doctor Who and Torchwood.

He has also worked as a location manager (For Your Eyes Only, Octopussy and Indiana Jones and the Temple of Doom) and as a production manager (Doctor Who).

In 2008, he produced the Torchwood serial Children of Earth, which led to his appointment as full-time producer (alongside Tracie Simpson) on the fifth series of Doctor Who, broadcast in 2010.

In 2014 he returned to Doctor Who to produce (alongside fellow producer Nikki Wilson) the eighth, ninth, and tenth series of Doctor Who which aired in 2014, 2015, and 2017.

Producing credits

References

External links

British television producers
Living people
Year of birth missing (living people)